The 2019 Staffordshire Moorlands District Council election took place on 2 May 2019 to elect members of Staffordshire Moorlands District Council in England. This was on the same day as other local elections.

Results summary

Election result

|-

Ward results

Alton

Bagnall & Stanley

Biddulph East

Biddulph Moor

Biddulph North

Biddulph South

Biddulph West

Brown Edge & Endon

Caverswall

Cellarhead

Cheadle North East

Cheadle South East

Cheadle West

Checkley

Cheddleton

Churnet

Dane

Forsbrook

Hamps Valley

Horton

Ipstones

Leek East

Leek North

Leek South

Leek West

Manifold

Werrington

By-elections

Biddulph West

A double by-election was called after the deaths of incumbent Conservative and Independent councillors.

References

2019 English local elections
May 2019 events in the United Kingdom
2019
2010s in Staffordshire